Die on Stage is the fourth and final studio album from Connecticut rock band Hostage Calm. The album was released on September 16, 2014 through Run For Cover Records. On July 22, 2014 the band released a music video for the single, "Your Head/Your Heart." The record was produced by Will Yip of Studio 4. This album will mark the first release with new drummer Keith Sidorowicz, who joined the band in 2013 following the departure of the band's former drummer, John Ross. On August 18, 2014 the band released the album's second single, "A Thousand Miles Away From Here." On September 2, 2014 the band premiered the album's third single, "Fallen Angel," courtesy of Fuse. The album was included at number 35 on Rock Sounds "Top 50 Albums of the Year" list.

Track listing

Personnel
Hostage Calm
Tom Chiari - Lead Guitar
Tim Casey - Bass, Vocals
Chris Martin - Lead Vocals, Guitars, Piano
Nick Balzano - Guitar, Backing Vocals
Keith Sidorowicz - Drums

References
 Citations

Sources

 

2014 albums
Hostage Calm albums
Run for Cover Records albums
Albums produced by Will Yip